Sputnikmusic is an American music community website offering music criticism and music news alongside features commonly associated with wiki-style websites.  The format of the website is unusual in that it includes both professional and amateur content, distinguishing it from professionally written music websites such as Pitchfork and Tiny Mix Tapes, as well as collecting and presenting a wiki-style metadata database in a manner comparable to Rate Your Music and Discogs.

Over time, the site came to be established as a credible source; it is now among the sources that Metacritic uses to compile "Critic Scores" and is used as a news source by other websites.  As a general rule, the staff writers tended to focus on new releases; however, any user was welcome to submit a review of any album that has been officially released. All genres of music were covered by the site, with dedicated subsections for metal, punk, indie, rock, hip hop, and pop; an 'Other' section also caters to electronica, jazz, reggae, trip hop, classical music, and soundtracks.

The musical focus of the site's staff had often been on non-mainstream artists, with the likes of Burial, Converge, Titus Andronicus, Cynic, Kayo Dot, Off Minor, and The Tallest Man on Earth performing strongly in the staff-voted Best of 2006, 2007, 2008, and 2010 features.

History
Sputnikmusic was originally launched by Jeremy Ferwerda as an offshoot from the Mxtabs network, which also included MusicianForums; the reviews that existed on the website on launch day had been imported from the latter's CD Reviews subforum. At this point, the site was simply a source of amateur content; it is also worth noting that due to its association with MXTabs, the site's focus was noticeably skewed toward guitar-based music, notably metal and rock, at this time.

In June 2006, following claims made by the MPA about the supposed illegality of music tabs, MXTabs was closed, later to be acquired by MusicNotes.  At this time, Sputnikmusic became its own separate entity, with MusicianForums renamed as the SputnikMusic Forums.  It was at this point that the focus of Sputnik began to shift toward providing professional content, with a news page added, and a stratification system implemented for reviewers.  As part of this shift, several features have also sporadically been provided by the site's staff writers, including live reviews, interviews, exclusive MP3 streams, and year-end features.

Reviewer stratification
Sputnikmusic has four classes of reviewer identifiers:

Staff writers are the writers who contribute the professional-standard content, which includes featured articles in addition to reviews.
Contributing reviewers can contribute features, but are not eligible for inclusion by Metacritic, yet are acknowledged as being writers who generate content of a passable quality. There are currently 16 contributing reviewers.
Emeritus is a status given to former staff writers who no longer contribute to the site.
Users include everybody who had not yet been promoted to any of the higher levels. Despite this, they can still contribute new reviews, artists, and albums to the database, edit data already present, and submit journals and lists.

Rating system
Sputnikmusic operates a simple 5-point rating system, starting at 1, that allows .1 intervals for staff writers and .5 intervals for all other users. As a guide to new reviewers, each of these values are assigned a word, ranging from 'Awful' (1.0) to 'Classic' (5.0).

As well as showing the score a reviewer has given to the album, a review page allows the scores given by other individual reviewers, and the average rating given by all users.  A bar chart shows how many votes each rating has once it has received at least two and a review.

Staff's top albums by year

References

External links
 Sputnikmusic
 Sputnikmusic Forums

American music websites
Internet properties established in 2005